The 2002 Great Alaska Shootout was held November 27, 2002, through November 30, 2002 at Sullivan Arena in Anchorage, Alaska

Brackets

Men's

Women's

References

Great Alaska Shootout
Great Alaska Shootout
Great Alaska Shootout
November 2002 sports events in the United States